Kemalpaşa is a large town and the center of the district of the same name in İzmir Province, Turkey. Its district area extends immediately to the east of İzmir's easternmost  metropolitan district, Bornova, and Kemalpaşa town being at a distance of only  from the historical and traditional center of İzmir, (Konak), it pulsates along with the rhythm of the big city, with corresponding high levels of development in terms of industry and services. İzmir-Ankara highway crosses the district area  to the north of the district center. Kemalpaşa district area borders on the administrative divisions of Manisa center in the north, Manisa's depending district of Turgutlu in the east and İzmir's depending districts of Torbalı and Bayındır in the south. The eastern and southern parts of Kemalpaşa district preserve their markedly rural characteristics, which results in an urbanization rate of only 25.7 for the district area as a whole, despite the presence of a strong industrial base in and to the west of Kemalpaşa town. Kemalpaşa's very large organized industrial zone (KOSBİ) brings together producers of construction materials, rubber and plastic goods, textiles and clothing, leather, paper, packaging materials, machinery and other equipment, including electrical tools and installations, dyes and other chemical substances, marble and car parts, as well as foundries and other metalworks.  Agriculture also occupies a portion with high added value in Kemalpaşa's economy, its cherries being of nationwide renown (known as Kemalpaşa kirazı in Turkish) and exported. Literacy is at a high level at 90%, and the neighboring Bornova, where Ege University is based, serves as a nearby pool in terms of trained personnel.

Administration 
Aside from the district center, Kemalpaşa district has five depending townships which have a municipal administration of their own. These are; Armutlu, Bağyurdu (Parsa), Ulucak, Yukarıkızılca. The district center itself, with a population of 31,336 for 2006 is divided into 19 quarters. The five depending townships and the 29 villages have a combined population of 49,472. The district's total population of 80,808 for 2006 corresponded to an increase of 35.5 per cent since 2000, a consequence of the region's high rate of development based on industrial activities. It is estimated that the yearly increase in population keeps its pace since then, and ranges between 10–15%, the employment opportunities offered by Kemalpaşa industry attracting migrants from across the nation.

A township depending the sanjak (subprovince) of Saruhan (Manisa) until the late-Ottoman times, the town was attached to the subprovince of İzmir in 1900 and a municipal administration was constituted the year after.

History 

Kemalpaşa region has always been a key point of passage between the Gulf of İzmir and the lands of the Anatolian interior. The recorded history dates back to 1300 BC. The Karabel relief depicting a Hittite warrior was until recently the only trace of that civilization discovered in western Anatolia. The recent discovery and the explorations that are currently being conducted in the prehistoric mound (höyük) near the depending municipality of Ulucak (Ulucak Höyüğü), is likely to shed new lights to the region's earlier history. There are also numerous tumuli in the Lydian style in the region.

Karabel Hittite-Luwian rock relief 
The relief is a late Hittite-Luwian rock relief about 1.5 meter wide and 2.5 meters high and located in a passage between two mountains on the road south to Torbalı at a distance of six kilometers from Kemalpaşa center. It is dated to the second half of the 13th century BCE during the reign of Tudhaliya IV. A male figure depicted standing with a bow in his right hand and a spear in his left wearing a tunic and a cone-shaped hat is identified as Tarkasnawa, King of Mira, according to a recent reading by David Hawkins, widely approved by scholars and matched with a name mentioned in Hattusa Hittite annals. The relief is called "Eti Baba" (the Hittite father) locally.

Nymphaion – Nif – Kemalpaşa 

The town's name in classical and medieval times was Nymphaion. It rose to prominence during the late Byzantine times, when it became the favourite winter residence of the Nicaean emperors during the 13th century. A palace, whose well-preserved remains are still extant, was built there by John III Doukas Vatatzes. The association with the Nicaean court made Nymphaion a center of imperial politics: the city was raised to an archbishopric, where John III spent his final months, and both Theodore II Laskaris and Michael VIII Palaiologos were crowned. The two 13th-century important treaties in 1214 and 1261 both referred to as Treaty of Nymphaeum were concluded there with the Italian states. The latter was to have an important impact on the region's future, virtually ceding Smyrna to the Republic of Genoa. In the last decades of the 13th century, it became a major Byzantine stronghold against the advances of the Turkish beyliks: both emperor Andronikos II Palaiologos and the celebrated general Alexios Philanthropenos used it as their headquarters in the 1290s. The town fell to the Turkish Bey of Saruhan in 1315. From 1867 until 1922, Nif was part of Aidin Vilayet.

Under Turkish rule, the town's original name was echoed in the Turkish name "Nif" which was in use until the early years of the Republic of Turkey. The name Nif was changed to Kemalpaşa in honor of Mustafa Kemal Paşa who had spent the night of 9 September 1922 here, before the closing chapter of the Occupation of Smyrna the next day, putting an end to the Greco-Turkish War (1919-1922) in the field. The name "Nif" is no longer used for the city, even colloquially, although its status of former name is common knowledge. Nif was one of the centers that were densely populated by Anatolian Greeks till the first quarter of the 20th century, before the Exchange of Greek and Turkish Populations.

The mountain on the slopes of which the city of Kemalpaşa extends and the district's most important stream are still called Nif (respectively, Nif Dağı and Nif Çayı). With its summit reaching 1.510 meters high, Mount Nif was one of the mountains called Olympus in ancient times and is renowned today for its dense forests of oaks, oleasters, pines and other trees of the Aegean basin, cold springs and trout farms. The River Nif enters the district area near the township of Ulucak, crosses the plain to skip tangentially into the area of the neighboring district of Bornova, at which level a Roman bridge is found, rejoins Kemalpaşa to flow into Gediz River further north near Manisa.

Industry and professions 

There are 306 large industrial enterprises based in Kemalpaşa district and the share of the population employed directly or indirectly in industrial activities reaches 60%. The organized industrial zone KOSBİ gathers on its own 236 large enterprises, 7 with full and 41 with partial foreign capital.

The total number of companies based in Kemalpaşa district is 14.831. 463 of these are enterprises active in industrial sectors and 183 are registered exporters, the rest being accounted by establishments oriented towards services or agriculture. 8 banks are present in Kemalpaşa district with a total of 9 branches.

Cherries, livestock breeding, and forestry 
The share of the population in Kemalpaşa district who pull their income from agriculture or animal breeding is 60%. Kemalpaşa region is well known for its cherries (Kemalpaşa kirazı in Turkish). 9 cooperatives set up for purposes of irrigation regulation and 6 others with agricultural development as objective bring together 3.137 persons. A large part of the land in Kemalpaşa district (1.310 hectares) is irrigated or has the infrastructure for regular irrigation, which explains the primary place occupied by maize among the grains produced, making Kemalpaşa an exceptional case in western Anatolia. The Union of Cherry Producers has 177 members, mostly large-scale producers. 1.594.600 cherry trees in total produced 47.838 tonnes of fruit in 2006 for Kemalpaşa. The increase compared to 2002 in the number of trees was 71.9% and in production 106.3%.

At about 2.500 hectares each, the respective shares of agricultural lands and forests in Kemalpaşa are roughly equal. Among the lands used for agriculture, fruit orchards, principally cherries, take the lead at 33% (758 hectares), with olive trees (22%, 400 hectares) and vineyards (16%, 370 hectares) following. The portion occupied by vineyards and grains more than halved between 2000 and 2006, while the land used for the production of cherries doubled. Since cherries are relatively easier to maintain and process, and a large national and export market exists, their production increasingly attracts the attention of urban-based and hobby-minded producers who would assure the daily care outside the collect typically through the offices of one villager. There is also a growing tendency towards diversification in the vegetables produced, new breeds in demand by Izmir's customer base and previously unheard of like broccolis, asparagus, soybeans, kiwis, kakis, also making their appearance. The level of mechanisation in agricultural activities is high and well above the national averages.

There are about 200 large dairies, poultries or livestock breeding farms across the district area, catering İzmir's huge market. The quantity of milk produced in Kemalpaşa in 2007 was 38.065 tonnes. There are 345.000 beehives and 345 tonnes honey and 10 tonnes of beeswax was produced in 2007.

Kemalpaşa center has an open market (bazaar) area covering 8.000 square meters, and the depending townships of Ulucak 3.000 and Armutlu 2.000 square meters, where local and rural products are sold. Outside KOSBİ industrial zone, firms established in Kemalpaşa realized exports reaching 260 million US Dollars in 2006, principally products of agriculture such as cherries, peaches, raisins and olive oil.

Social life 

Kemalpaşa's proximity to İzmir and the tendency of the population to head for the big city for activities of social life becomes a factor which plays against Kemalpaşa district center in terms of the availability on the spot of social facilities. While the mountain passage at Karabel where the Hittite monument is located has been arranged into a picnic area and the remains of Vatatzes's palace could attract more visitors, the absence of facilities for overnight visitors tend to limit Kemalpaşa's tourism potential to daily visits or excursions by trekking or hunting groups.

One popular spot at a distance of a few kilometers to Kemalpaşa center is the "Kazakh Valley" or "Kımız Farm", located near the forests on the slopes of the Mount Nif and arranged around Central Asian themes, complete with a yurt built in concrete, serving Kazakh/Uzbek food and reputed to have one of the best offers of the ancestral drink kımız in Turkey. The stock farm within the establishment provide visitors or accomplished riders with the opportunity to ride Haflinger horses.

Twin towns and sister cities 

 Kamëz, Albania, since 7 January 2011 
 Kavadarci, North Macedonia, since 11 February 2013
 Erzurum, Turkey since 1561

See also 

 Mount Nif
 Ege University Observatory at Kurudağ

Footnotes

Resources 

 

Towns in Turkey
Ancient Greek archaeological sites in Turkey
Populated places in İzmir Province
Districts of İzmir Province
Things named after Mustafa Kemal Atatürk